Khanapur is a town in Nirmal district of the Indian state of Telangana. It is a Municipality with 12 electoral wards, Mandal, Assembly Constituency and Revenue Division in Nirmal District. it is a good agricultural land located near Godavari river flowing south to north.

Geography 
It has an average elevation of 229 meters (754 feet). located on the banks of river godavari.

Khanapur has a leisure place called Sadarmat which is small reservoir.  This will be a picnic place during summer and winter time.  Khanapur can be reached by 34 km west from Nirmal (NH-7).

Demographics 
According to Indian census, 2014, the demographic details of Khanapur mandal is as follows:
 Total Population: 	88,950in 13,916 Households.
 Male Population: 	42.400and Female Population: 	36.950
 Children Under 6-years of age: 9,600	(Boys -	5,650	and Girls -	3,950)
 Total Literates: 	39.252

Khanapur Mandal 
According to Indian census, 2014 .List of all towns and Villages in Khanapur Mandal of Nirmal district, Telangana.Village
1	Advisarangapur	
2	Badankurthy	
3	Bavapur	        
4	Beernandi	
5	Bevapur	       
6	Burugpalle	
7	Chamanpalle	
8	Dhomdari	
9	Dilwarpur	
10	Ervachintal	
11	Gangaipet	
12	Gummanuyenglapur 
13	Iqbalpur	
14	Itikyal	       
15	Khanapur	
16	Kosagutta	
17	Kothapet	
18	Mandapalle	
19	Maskapur	
20	Medampalle	
21	Nagpur	       
22	Paspula	        
23	Patha Yellapur		        
24	Rajura	       
25      Sathnapalle-RamReddyPally	
26	Shetpalle	
27	Surjapur	
28	Tarlapad	
29	Vaspalle	
30	Venkampochampad	
31.     Gosampally

References

Adilabad district
Nirmal district